Christina Gao (born March 7, 1994) is an American former figure skater. She is the 2012 Skate America silver medalist, the 2009 Junior Grand Prix Final bronze medalist, and the 2009 U.S. Junior bronze medalist.

Personal life
Christina Gao was born in Cincinnati, Ohio. Her father was a junior national badminton champion in China.

Gao spent several years in Toronto, Ontario, Canada, before moving to Boston in 2012. She was a National Merit semifinalist. In the summer of 2012, she worked at a hospital shadowing a gastroenterologist. In the fall, she began studying at Harvard University, taking a full course load.  She graduated in 2017.

Career

Early career
Gao began skating at age 7. Early in her career, she trained in northern Kentucky, coached by Stephanie Miller and Ted Masdea.

In the 2004–2005 season, competing on the Juvenile level, Gao won the silver medal at her regional championship to qualify for the United States Junior Championships, where she placed 12th. She moved up to the Intermediate level the following year and won the pewter medal at her regional championship to qualify for the United States Junior Championships, where she placed 11th in her qualifying group and did not advance to the final. She moved up to the Novice level for the 2006–2007 season and placed 13th at her regional championship and did not qualify to her sectional championship.

In the 2007–2008 season, competing again on the novice level, Gao won both her regional and sectional championship to qualify for the 2008 U.S. Championships, where she finished 12th.

The following season, Gao moved up to the junior level. She won the silver medal at her regional championship and the gold medal at her sectional championship to qualify for the 2009 U.S. Championships. At Nationals, she placed third in the short program and second in the free skating, winning the bronze medal overall.

2009–2010 season
Due to limited ice time in Kentucky, Gao relocated before the 2009–10 season to Toronto, where she was coached by Brian Orser, the 1984 and 1988 Olympic silver medalist, at the Toronto Cricket, Skating and Curling Club. Gao made her ISU Junior Grand Prix debut in the 2009–10 season. She won the bronze medal at the 2009–10 ISU Junior Grand Prix event in Poland with an overall score of 134.55 points. She had also been assigned to the event in Turkey, where she won another bronze earning 135.01 points.

She qualified for the 2009–10 Junior Grand Prix Final. At the Junior Grand Prix, she placed fifth in the short program with 52.82 points and third in the free skate with 98.65 points, winning the bronze medal overall with a score of 151.47 points. She earned new personal bests in both segments of the competition.

At the 2010 U.S. Championships in January 2010, she placed fifth in the short program with a score 56.26 points and fifth in the free skate with 100.27. She placed 5th overall with 156.53.

She was assigned to compete at the 2010 World Junior Championships. She placed 8th overall.

2010–2011 season
Gao was assigned to the 2010–11 ISU Junior Grand Prix events in Austria and Japan. She won the silver medal in her first event with a total of 167.14 points. Gao withdrew from the competition in Japan but was reassigned to Germany based on her result in Austria. She placed second totaling 155.67 points. Those placements qualified her for the 2010–11 ISU Junior Grand Prix Final, where she came in sixth position earning 145.01 points. She finished 5th at the US Championships at the senior level. She was fourth at the 2011 World Junior Championships.

2011–2012 season
Gao was assigned to the 2011 Cup of China and 2011 Cup of Russia for the Grand Prix season. She had a hip injury and was off the ice for most of July. At her first event, Cup of China, she came in eighth in the short program with a score of 51.99. She placed fourth in the free skate with a score of 100.47 to finish fifth. At Cup of Russia, she was tenth after the short program with a score of 39.64. She also placed tenth in the free skate with a score of 78.13, to place tenth overall. Gao finished 5th at the 2012 U.S. Nationals Championships. Gao then competed at the 2012 World Junior Championships and finished 7th at the event.

In March 2012, Gao left Toronto and returned to Cincinnati. After a June visit to Boston, Gao decided to train with coaches Mark Mitchell and Peter Johansson at The Skating Club of Boston.

2012-2013 season 
After winning the silver medal at the 2012 Skate America, Gao placed fourth at the 2012 Trophée Éric Bompard. In late November, ISU officials announced that she would compete at the 2012–13 Grand Prix Final, replacing Yulia Lipnitskaya who withdrew from the event due to injuries. Gao placed sixth at the Grand Prix Final. She was fifth at the 2013 U.S. Championships and was named in the United States team to the 2013 Four Continents in Osaka, Japan where she finished 4th and was the highest ranking American at the event ahead of teammates Gracie Gold and Agnes Zawadzki.

2013-2014 season 
Gao opened her 2013-2014 season by winning the bronze medal at the 2013 Ondrej Nepela Trophy behind Russian Nikol Gosviani. She has been assigned to two events for the 2013–14 ISU Grand Prix series, her first event was at the 2013 Skate Canada where she finished 4th. In her next assignment, Gao finished 8th at the 2013 Trophée Éric Bompard.

Programs

Competitive highlights

2009–10 season to present

2004–05 to 2008–09

Detailed results 
(Small medals for short and free programs awarded only at ISU Championships.)

SP = Short program; FS = Free skating.

References

External links

 
 Christina Gao at IceNetwork
 Christina Gao at Sportfolio

1994 births
Living people
American female single skaters
Sportspeople from Cincinnati
American sportspeople of Chinese descent
American sportswomen of Chinese descent
Harvard University alumni
21st-century American women